Predestination in Catholicism is the Catholic Church's teachings on predestination and Catholic saints' views on it. The church believes that predestination is not based on anything external to God - for example, the grace of baptism is not merited but given freely to those who receive baptism - since predestination was formulated before the foundation of the world. Predestination to eternal life, deification, divine filiation, and heaven encompasses all of mankind, for God has assumed man to his divinity by becoming man. Since man is a microcosm of creation, all of creation shares in man's predestination: it belongs to everyone, it is destined for renewal on Judgment Day, and it is being guided to its destiny by Divine Providence.

Official teaching

Nature of predestination
"Predestination" is God's plan to give each person eternal life through divine filiation in Jesus through the Holy Spirit; in other words. The whole Trinity formulated this plan from eternity. Predestination unfolds through the creation of the world, sacred history, the life of Jesus Christ, his sacrifice on the Cross, the work of the Holy Spirit, and through the Catholic Church and its Sacraments. Because God is love, he predestines out of love and predestination is a grace.  The two most prominent explanations of the Catholic concept of predestination are termed Molinism and Augustinianism; both fall within the scope of Catholic orthodoxy.

Predestination and divine providence
The purpose of life is deification and eternal life. As such, Divine Providence leads each person to his or her destiny. This destiny will be fully realized at the universal resurrection when one will get back one's own body - only glorified like Jesus' resurrected body.

Predestination and free will
Because God is omniscient, predestination takes into account each person's response to his grace (whether to accept it by virtue or reject it by sin). For the sake of accomplishing predestination, God permits sin. Examples of this include God permitting original sin in light of Jesus redeeming man, and Jesus being rejected by his people Israel in order to fulfill the prophecy of the Servant Songs.

Predestination and death
Because God is omniscient, predestination takes into account the fact that man would become mortal due to sin, and includes, not only the limited amount of time that each person has to fulfill his or her life by receiving divine filiation, but also every grace that God gives to each person.

Predestination and worship
Each person is predestined to take part in God the Son's divine relationship to God the Father, because - though one is not a god - one becomes like God by divine filiation through baptism. By divine filiation, one has the right to worship God, even to call him one's own Father just like Jesus did.

Predestination and prayer
As God wills each person to go to Heaven, the petition "Your will be done on Earth as it is in Heaven" in the Our Father means one is praying for predestination to be fully realized on Earth just as it is already fully realized in Heaven, e.g., in the saints that live forever in Heaven.

Predestination is not eternal security
No one can know for certain—except by special revelation—who will be saved or not saved, as the Council of Trent condemned belief in eternal security. For example, neither the Bible nor the church teaches that Judas Iscariot can be known with certainty to be in hell.

Predestination is not double predestination
No one is predestined to evil or to damnation. Man was not created or predestined to die, as his death - unlike other organisms - was a consequence of sin.

Examples of predestination
Besides the aforesaid broad understanding of predestination, the church believes in specific examples of predestination. Some of these include: the universal destination of goods, the new Heaven and new Earth coming to be on Judgment Day, Divine Providence leading creation toward the new Heaven and new Earth, the election of Israel as God's chosen people, the Virgin Mary being the mother of Jesus, Jesus fulfilling the Scriptures, and the permanence of apostolic succession.

Augustinism and Thomism
Augustine of Hippo contributed a great deal to the church's teaching on predestination. He taught that predestination is not dependent on man, but on God's own faithfulness, since by predestination God promised what he himself would do for man, including making man do what good deeds he himself has commanded of man. This said, not everything Augustine taught conforms to the church's teachings, such as his belief in double predestination.

Like Augustine, Thomas Aquinas also believed in double predestination:

Debates
Catholic scholars are divided on certain questions about predestination. Why does God only give certain graces to certain people, such as only giving the Immaculate Conception to the Virgin Mary (apart from preparing her for her role as the Mother of God)? Is Purgatory a part of predestination as a posthumous purification for those who need it before going to Heaven? And if God is perfect, how could he fail to save someone from Hell - in other words, does God stop willing the person's salvation once they are damned?

References

Catholic theology and doctrine